William Sharp (1803–1875) was a British-born painter who is credited with introducing chromolithography to America in 1840.

Sharp had worked for the lithographer Charles Hullmandel in London.  On his arrival in Boston in 1840, Sharp became partners with Francis Michelin, another former employee of Hullmandel.

References

Image gallery

External links

 WorldCat

English emigrants to the United States
1803 births
1875 deaths
English printmakers
Botanical illustrators
Artists from Boston
American lithographers 
English lithographers
19th-century lithographers